Trencher, formed in 2001, is a London-based, casio-grind band.  They have toured extensively with bands such as The Locust, Some Girls and Daughters amongst others.  They were one of the last bands to record a Peel Session in 2004. They are currently signed to Southern Records and have released music on many labels, including Johnson Family Records, Upset the Rhythm, Crucificados and Enjoyment Records.

Members
 Pox: Bass, vocals
 Lock-Monger: drums
 M.Shit: Casio, Lounge Crooning

Discography
 Presumed Dead cassette (2001)
 Black Queen/Trencher split 7-inch with Black Queen (2002)
 Kurt Schwitters/Trencher split 7-inch with Kurt Schwitters (2002)
 S.W.A Thrusts (2003)
 Trencher/The Kinetic Crash Cooperation split 5" with The Kinetic Crash Cooperation (2003)
 When Dracula Thinks "Look at me" CD (2003)
 Orthrelm/Trencher split 5" with Orthrelm (2005)
 Esquilax/Trencher (BBC Peel session) split 10-inch with Esquilax (2005, Upset The Rhythm)
 "Esquilax/Trencher" split cassette (2005) DLPR records
 Loa Loa/Trencher split CD with Loa Loa (2005)
 Cutting Pink With Knives/Trencher split 5" with Cutting Pink With Knives (2005)
 Trencher/Wether hexagonal lathe 8" split with Wether (2006)
 Phil Collins 3/Trencher split 7-inch with Phil Collins 3 (2006)
 Lips (2006, Southern Records)
 99-05 Hi-Jinx Thus Far CS (2007)
 All Suffering...Soon To End 12-inch vinyl (2011) Enjoyment Records
 All Suffering...Soon To End CS (2011) Suplex Cassettes
 Azid cassette (2016)

References

English rock music groups
Mathcore musical groups